Streptoperas is a genus of moths belonging to the subfamily Drepaninae.

Species
 Streptoperas luteata Hampson, 1895
 Streptoperas crenelata Swinhoe, 1902

References

Drepaninae
Drepanidae genera